Choi Jae-hyeon (born 20 April 1994) is a South Korean footballer who plays as midfielder for Jeonnam Dragons.

Career

Choi played college football for Kwangwoon University.

Choi joined K League 1 side Jeonnam Dragons in January 2017. He made a goal and an assist in his debut game on 15 April 2017.

References

External links 

1994 births
Living people
Association football midfielders
South Korean footballers
Jeonnam Dragons players
K League 1 players
K League 2 players
Kwangwoon University alumni